Kennedale is a city in Tarrant County, Texas, United States. The city had a population of 8,543 as of 2018.

Geography

Kennedale is located at  (32.650070, –97.218095).

History
Settled in the 1860s, the community was named for Oliver S. Kennedy, who platted the area and donated every other lot to the Southern Pacific Railroad. Linda Rhodes is the first female Mayor.

Demographics

2020 census

As of the 2020 United States census, there were 8,517 people, 2,988 households, and 2,287 families residing in the city.

2000 census
As of the census of 2000, there were 5,850 people, 2,141 households, and 1,616 families residing in the city. The population density was 968.5 people per square mile (374.0/km2). There were 2,241 housing units at an average density of 371.0 per square mile (143.3/km2). The racial makeup of the city was 88.51% White, 3.45% African American, 0.75% Native American, 0.97% Asian, 4.29% from other races, and 2.02% from two or more races. Hispanic or Latino of any race were 9.91% of the population.

There were 2,141 households, out of which 40.2% had children under the age of 18 living with them, 58.2% were married couples living together, 12.3% had a female householder with no husband present, and 24.5% were non-families. 19.2% of all households were made up of individuals, and 5.1% had someone living alone who was 65 years of age or older. The average household size was 2.71 and the average family size was 3.11.

In the city, the population was spread out, with 28.6% under the age of 18, 8.7% from 18 to 24, 32.5% from 25 to 44, 21.5% from 45 to 64, and 8.7% who were 65 years of age or older. The median age was 35 years. For every 100 females, there were 96.3 males. For every 100 females age 18 and over, there were 93.2 males.

The median income for a household in the city was $49,091, and the median income for a family was $53,901. Males had a median income of $43,182 versus $25,508 for females. The per capita income for the city was $24,323. About 4.9% of families and 6.4% of the population were below the poverty line, including 6.5% of those under age 18 and 12.4% of those age 65 or over.

Education
Kennedale is served by the Kennedale Independent School District.

Trinity Valley Baptist Seminary and College, an Independent Baptist institution of higher learning, was established in Kennedale in 1960.

Kennedale ISD has two elementary schools, one junior high, and one high school.

Climate 
The climate in this area is characterized by hot, humid summers and generally mild to cool winters.  According to the Köppen Climate Classification system, Kennedale has a humid subtropical climate, abbreviated "Cfa" on climate maps.

Economy

Top employers
According to Kennedale's 2020 Comprehensive Annual Financial Report, the top employers in the city are:

References

External links
 City of Kennedale official website
 Kennedale Independent School District
 Kennedale Junior High School

Dallas–Fort Worth metroplex
Cities in Texas
Cities in Tarrant County, Texas
Populated places established in the 1860s